Fernando Bale (born December 3, 2013) is a retired Australian Greyhound, which many in Australia thought to be the greatest racing greyhound in Australian racing. He earned a world-record $1.3m in prize money.

Appearance 
Fernando Bale was mostly white in color with most of his body and legs white, but he also had a brindle rump and face (except a white stripe in the middle of his face). His official colour was white and dark brindle.

Career 
His first victory was the 525-m maiden special weight at The Meadows. After two further wins, he won his first of seven G1 races in the National Derby at Wentworth Park. After the Ballarat Derby, Fernando won the G1 Golden Easter Egg. His last two G1 wins were in the Adelaide Cup at Angle Park and the Top Gun at The Meadows.

He raced in the Melbourne Cup Final, but placed second by a small margin. He then won the G2 Ballarat final and a free-for-all before injury took him to stud. As of June 2022 he had sired 165 Group and Listed winners.

Pedigree

References 

Greyhound racing in Australia
Racing greyhounds